Testosterone propionate/testosterone phenylpropionate/testosterone isocaproate/testosterone caproate (TP/TPP/TiC/TCa), sold under the brand name Omnadren or Omnadren 250,  is an injectable combination medication of four testosterone esters, all of which are androgens/anabolic steroids, which is no longer marketed. Its constituents included:

 Testosterone propionate (30 mg)
 Testosterone phenylpropionate (60 mg)
 Testosterone isocaproate (60 mg)
 Testosterone caproate (100 mg)

See also
 Testosterone propionate/testosterone phenylpropionate/testosterone isocaproate
 Testosterone propionate/testosterone phenylpropionate/testosterone isocaproate/testosterone decanoate
 List of combined sex-hormonal preparations § Androgens

References

Abandoned drugs
Androgens and anabolic steroids
Androstanes
Combined androgen formulations
Prodrugs
Testosterone